"Aces" is a song written by Cheryl Wheeler, and recorded by American country music artist Suzy Bogguss.  It was released in March 1992 as the third single and title track from her album Aces.  The song reached number 9 on the Billboard Hot Country Singles & Tracks chart in July 1992. Wheeler herself previously recorded the song on her 1990 album Circles and Arrows.

Chart performance

Year-end charts

References

1990 songs
1992 singles
Suzy Bogguss songs
Song recordings produced by Jimmy Bowen
Liberty Records singles
Songs written by Cheryl Wheeler